Kamāl Khan (born 25 April 1989) is an Indian singer known for his work as a playback singer in Bollywood films. He won the reality singing competition Sa Re Ga Ma Pa Singing Superstar in 2010. Later he won the Zee Cine Awards "Fresh Singing Talent 2012 (Male)" for the song "Ishq Sufiyana" from the film The Dirty Picture (2012).

In 2017, he released the Punjabi song "Dili Sara", featuring Kuwar Virk, as a single. The song became a super hit overnight. The video has over 150 million views on YouTube as of May 2022.

Early life and career
Kamal was born and brought up in Reeth kheri village, near Patiala, Punjab, to Zafar Khan and Sakina Ali, who is an employee health department in Patiala. Kamal started learning music at age five from his uncle (Mama ji) Ustad Shauqat Ali Deewana ji, who became his musical mentor. His mother is also a music lover. Later he left his studies because he started taking part in singing competitions and musical shows. Until he appeared in Sa Re Ga Ma Pa, his father did not want him to become a singer. He mentioned in one of the episodes of the show, wherein his father gave a guest and surprising appearance, that upon his father's advice, he started working in a factory where his daily wage was only Rs. 40 a day. On his payday, he requested his father to collect his first salary. When his dad went there to get Kamal's first salary, he cried and realised that he should let Kamal pursue his singing. Kamal got his surname "Khan" from their listeners and friends when he was a contestant of Sa Re Ga Ma Pa because he likes Ustad Nusrat Fateh Ali Khan's songs and he sings his song like him.

Career
His career turnaround came when in 2010, he was selected as a contestant on the singing reality show Sa Re Ga Ma Pa Singing Superstar. He had music director duo of Vishal–Shekhar as mentor-judge. At the grand finale, held at Andheri Sports Complex, Mumbai, on 25 December 2010, he went on to win the show, also getting a Grande MK II car and a Hero ZMR bike. Composer duo Vishal–Shekhar, who were also mentors on the show, became his real-life mentors and eventually offered him his debut playback song, "Wallah Re Wallah" in Tees Maar Khan (2010), released a day before the show ended. Later they also gave him his big break with the hit "Ishk Sufiana" for The Dirty Picture (2012). In 2013, he rose to prominence with the song "Jhooth Bolliya" from Jolly LLB. His 2017 song "Dilli Sara" was also popular.

Albums & singles

Filmography

Awards and nominations

References

External links
 Official website

 

Living people
Bollywood playback singers
1989 births
Musicians from Patiala
Sa Re Ga Ma Pa participants
Singing talent show winners
Punjabi-language singers
Indian male playback singers
Punjabi people